Lot 2 is a township in Prince County, Prince Edward Island, Canada created during the 1764–1766 survey of Samuel Holland.  It is part of North Parish.

Population
 1,655 (2006 census)
 1,720  (2001 census)
 1,766  (1996 census)

Communities

Incorporated municipalities:

 Greenmount-Montrose
 Miminegash
 St. Felix
 St. Louis
 Tignish Shore

Civic address communities:

 Deblois
 Ebbsfleet
 Greenmount
 Harper
 Kildare Capes
 Leoville
 Palmer Road
 Pleasant View
 St. Edward
 St. Felix
 St. Lawrence
 St. Peter and St. Paul
 St. Roch
 Tignish Shore
 Woodvale

History

The township went through various owners under feudalism when Prince Edward Island was a British colony prior to Canadian Confederation:

 James Hunter and William Hunter, Merchants. (1767-1810)
  John Hill  (1838)
 Sir Samuel Cunard. (1864)

02
Geography of Prince County, Prince Edward Island